Kalandri is a city in Sirohi District, Rajasthan, India. It is located about 15 km west of Sirohi. Kalandari is the headquarters of a sub tehsil of the district. The Jawahar Navodaya Vidyalaya of Sirohi district is based here.

References

External links
 Official website

Villages in Sirohi district